Disintegrin and metalloproteinase domain-containing protein 18 is an enzyme that in humans is encoded by the ADAM18 gene.

This gene encodes a member of the ADAM (a disintegrin and metalloprotease domain) family. Members of this family are membrane-anchored proteins structurally related to snake venom disintegrins, and have been implicated in a variety of biologic processes involving cell-cell and cell-matrix interactions, including fertilization, muscle development, and neurogenesis. The protein encoded by this gene is a sperm surface protein.

References

Further reading

External links
 The MEROPS online database for peptidases and their inhibitors: M12.957
 

Proteases
Human proteins
EC 3.4.24